Dale Anthony Jones (born 12 March 1964 in St. John's) is a retired Antiguan and Barbudan middle distance runner who specialized in the 800 metres.

He won the silver medal at the 1990 Central American and Caribbean Games and the bronze medal at the 1993 Central American and Caribbean Games. At the 1984 Olympic Games he competed on the 4 × 400 m relay team. At the 1988 Olympic Games he was knocked out in the heats of the 1500 metres, but the time of 3:49.41 minutes was a new national record. At the 1991 World Championships he competed in both 800 m and 1500 m, setting a national 800 m record of 1:48.62 minutes. He also competed at the 1993 World Championships.

Achievements

References

External links
 

1964 births
Living people
Antigua and Barbuda male middle-distance runners
Athletes (track and field) at the 1984 Summer Olympics
Athletes (track and field) at the 1988 Summer Olympics
Athletes (track and field) at the 1992 Summer Olympics
Olympic athletes of Antigua and Barbuda
Athletes (track and field) at the 1983 Pan American Games
Athletes (track and field) at the 1987 Pan American Games
Athletes (track and field) at the 1991 Pan American Games
Pan American Games competitors for Antigua and Barbuda
Athletes (track and field) at the 1998 Commonwealth Games
Commonwealth Games competitors for Antigua and Barbuda
Competitors at the 1990 Central American and Caribbean Games
Competitors at the 1993 Central American and Caribbean Games
Central American and Caribbean Games silver medalists for Antigua and Barbuda
Central American and Caribbean Games bronze medalists for Antigua and Barbuda
People from St. John's, Antigua and Barbuda
Central American and Caribbean Games medalists in athletics